Scenes of the Crime is a 2001 film directed by Dominique Forma and written by Daniel Golka, Amit Mehta, and Forma. It stars Jon Abrahams, Jeff Bridges, Noah Wyle, R. Lee Ermey, Peter Greene, Mädchen Amick, Morris Chestnut, Bob Gunton, and Brian Goodman.

The film had its world premiere at the Deauville American Film Festival on September 8, 2001, and was released in the United States on DVD on September 30, 2003. It was met with mixed opinions and moderate, but ultimately positive reviews.

Plot
The story revolves around a young driver, Lenny (Abrahams), working for a gangster, running various errands and asking no questions. After the kidnapping of an enemy mobster, Jimmy Berg (Bridges), a bitter feud erupts between the two groups with Lenny caught in the middle. Stuck in a van alone with Berg, surrounded by Berg's men, the otherwise neutral driver is forced to choose a side, but is torn by the decision.

The film envelops the events that take place amongst various characters involved in the Mexican standoff, finally leading to a twist ending that is surprisingly upbeat.

Cast
Jeff Bridges as Jimmy Berg
Jon Abrahams as Lenny Burroughs
R. Lee Ermey as Mr. Parker
Mädchen Amick as Carmen
Morris Chestnut as Ray
Kerri Randles as Donna
Noah Wyle as Seth
Henry Rollins as Greg
Lombardo Boyar as Zeke
Kenny Johnston as Al
Peter Greene as Rick
Bob Gunton as Steven, Jimmy's Partner
Dominic Purcell as Mark
Robert Wahlberg as Arnon
Brian Goodman as Trevor
Nicholas Gonzalez as Marty
Justin Louis as Louis
Mizuo Peck as Sharon
Nick Carello as Police Officer
Loyd Catlett as Police Officer
Jack Forbes as Tow truck driver
Chase Ellison as Blake Berg
Jon Powell as Customer
Kim Yates as Steven's Maid
Robert Harvey as Chief Accountant
Amy Wieczorek as Theresa
Ian Ruskin as Trevor's Assistant

External links

 Dominique Forma's official site

2001 films
American crime thriller films
Films scored by Christopher Young
2001 crime thriller films
2000s English-language films
2000s American films